Into the New World and similar can refer to:
 "Into the New World" (song), a song by Girls' Generation
 Into the New World (concert), a concert tour by Girls' Generation
 Into the New World (album), live album by Girls' Generation
 Symphony No. 9 (Dvořák), also called "From the New World"

See also
 New World
 From the New World (disambiguation)